Fortaleza C.E.I.F. is a professional Colombian football team based in Cota, in the Cundinamarca Department, currently playing in the Categoría Primera B. The team has been promoted to the Categoría Primera A twice, in 2013 and 2015. From 2018 to 2020, they played their home games at the Estadio Municipal de Cota, moving afterwards to the Estadio Metropolitano de Techo in Bogotá.

History
The club was founded on 15 November 2010 as Fortaleza F.C., based in the municipality of Soacha. The club joined the Categoría Primera B after buying the licence of the recently dissolved club Atlético Juventud.

In the 2013 Primera B season, the team was champion of the Finalización tournament, allowing them play the finals against Uniautónoma. The team lost the title, losing the home match with a 0–2 score, and drawing 1–1 in the away match. However, the team was promoted to the Primera A after winning against Cúcuta Deportivo in the Promotion/relegation playoff with a 2–1 global score.

Fortaleza was relegated after its first year in the Primera A. The club ranked 16th in the Apertura tournament and 13th in the Finalización tournament, being the worst team in the Relegation table.

In 2015, the club was renamed Fortaleza C.E.I.F. after merging with the amateur football club C.E.I.F. (Centro de Entrenamiento Integrado para el Fútbol).
That season, the club was promoted after reaching the finals, however they lost the title against Atlético Bucaramanga with a 0–2 aggregate score.

Current squad

Managers
 Jaime Manjarrés (2011–12)
 Roberto Vidales (2012–13)
 Hernán Pacheco (2013–14)
 Alexis García (2014)
 Nilton Bernal (2015–16)
 Freddy Amazo (2016)
 Carlos Barato (2016–17)
 Carlos Mora (2017)
 David Barato (2018–19)
 Pablo Garabello (2020)
 Nelson Flórez (2021–)

Source: Worldfootball.net

See also
 Atlético Juventud Soacha

References

External links
 Official website
 Fortaleza profile on DIMAYOR

Football clubs in Colombia
2010 establishments in Colombia
Categoría Primera A clubs
Categoría Primera B clubs
Association football clubs established in 2010